Cicănești is a commune in Argeș County, Muntenia, Romania. It is composed of four villages: Bărăști, Cicănești, Mioarele and Urechești.

Natives
Gheorghe Păun

References

Communes in Argeș County
Localities in Muntenia